List of television stations in Andalusia include the following:

Autonomous channels

Provincial channels

Almería

Cádiz 
 Antena Bahía TV
 Canal Cádiz Televisión
 Canal Sierra de Cádiz TV
 Onda Chipiona Televisión
 Onda Jerez TV
 Onda Sur Televisión
 Ondaluz Televisión
 Telepuerto
 Tele Puerto Real
 Televisión del Sur
 Televisión San Roque
 Arcos Televisión
 Arlu
 Cable Televisión Conil
 Canal 43 Rota TV
 Canal 66
 Canal V TV
 CATV Rota
 Isla Televisión
 Olvera CATV
 Onda Bahía
 Onda Luz TV
 PDR TV Local Prado del Rey
 RTO (Radio Televisión Olvera)
 RTV Los Barrios
 Sintonía Seline La Línea
 TBC 90 Ubrique
 TBC Televisión Bahía de Cádiz
 TDC Sanlúcar
 Tele Barbate
 Tele Chipiona
 Tele Puerto
 Tele Rota
 Telealcalá del Valle
 TV Algeciras (Onda Algeciras TV)
 TV Campo de Gibraltar
 Videofaro I Chipiona

Córdoba

Granada

Huelva

Jaén

Málaga

Sevilla

See also 
 Television in Spain

External links 
 http://www.tvlocal.com/television.htm

Mass media in Andalusia
Spanish television-related lists